Pericalymma megaphyllum is a plant species of the family Myrtaceae endemic to Western Australia.

It blooms in November producing white-pink flowers.

It is found on elevated watershed areas in the South West  regions of Western Australia between Nannup and Augusta where it grows sandy clay soils over laterite.

References

megaphyllum
Flora of Western Australia
Plants described in 1999